Kouk Samraong is a village in the commune of Banteay Chhmar in Thma Puok District in Banteay Meanchey Province in north-western Cambodia.

Demographics
In 1998 it had a population of 503 people; 249 male, 254 female.

References

External links
Satellite map at Maplandia

Thma Puok District
Villages in Cambodia
Populated places in Banteay Meanchey province